Onychipodia nigricostata is a moth of the subfamily Arctiinae. It was described by Arthur Gardiner Butler in 1894. It is found in Kenya.

References

Endemic moths of Kenya
Lithosiini
Moths described in 1894